The An-Nur Kota Raya Mosque is a mosque in Plaza Kotaraya, Johor Bahru, Johor, Malaysia. It is owned by Johor Corporation (J-Corp), the Johor state government's investment arm.

See also
 Islam in Malaysia

Mosques in Johor